Bowbank is a village in Lunedale, a side valley of Teesdale, in County Durham, England.

For centuries, it lay within the historic county boundaries of the North Riding of Yorkshire, but along with the rest of the former Startforth Rural District it was transferred to County Durham on 1 April 1974, under the provisions of the Local Government Act 1972.

References

External links

Villages in County Durham